The United States women's national softball team is the national softball team of the United States. It is governed by USA Softball (formerly known as the Amateur Softball Association) and takes part in international softball competitions. The US team has been dominant in international play, taking the gold medal in three straight Olympics and seven straight world championships. They won the silver medal at the 2008 and 2020 Summer Olympics. In the 2004 Olympics the team held its opponents to one run scored in 7 games. The lone run came in a 5–1 victory over the Australian team. It was the first run scored by an opponent against the US softball team in 9 games.

On March 26, 2008, the United States Olympic softball team had their 185-game winning streak snapped in a no-hitter thrown by Virginia Tech's pitcher Angela Tincher, who struck out 10 batters in a 1–0 exhibition win for the Hokies.  The no-hit win proved something extra special in this case, as Tincher had previously tried out and failed to make the 2008 US Olympic softball team.
In 2022, the World Games was hosted giving the softball team a chance to avenge their olympic loss in Japan. Eight members who won a silver Olympic medal were on the team in the World Games. The roster was composed of eleven former student athletes and seven current athletes from 12 NCAA Division 1 teams.

2020 Olympic roster

Results summary
 Olympics: Gold Medal – 1996, 2000, 2004; Silver Medal – 2008, 2020
 ISF Women's World Championship: Gold Medal – 1974, 1978, 1986, 1990, 1994, 1998, 2002, 2006, 2010, 2016,  2018; Silver Medal – 1965, 1970, 2012. 2014
 Softball at the World Games: Gold Medal – 1981, 1985, 2022
 Softball at the Pan American Games: Gold Medal – 1979, 1987, 1991, 1995, 1999, 2003, 2007, 2011, 2019; Silver Medal – 1983, 2015
 World Cup of Softball: 1st – 2006, 2007, 2009, 2010, 2011, 2012, 2014, 2015, 2018, 2019; 2nd – 2005, 2013, 2016
 Japan Softball Cup: 1st – 2006, 2007, 2009, 2010, 2015; 2nd – 2016
 Canada Cup: Gold Medal – 1999, 2002, 2003, 2007, 2009, 2022; Silver Medal – 2005, 2011, 2012, 2014; Bronze Medal – 2013

All-time results

Results for the following international competitions could not be located:
1981 World Games
1985 World Games
1999 Canada Cup
2002 Canada Cup
2003 Canada Cup
2005 Canada Cup
2011 Canada Cup

International friendlies were not included. The 2008 KFC Bound for Beijing Tour against colleges and NPF teams in the United States were not included as they were not against international opponents.

Summary

1965

1970

1974

1978

1979

1982

1983

1986

1987

1990

1991

1994

1995

1996

1998

1999

2000

2002

2003

2004

2005

2006

2007

2008

2009

2010

2011

2012

2013

2014

References

External links
International Softball Federation

 
Softball in the United States
Women's national softball teams
Team